Diogo Meireles da Costa  (born 19 September 1999) is a professional footballer who plays as a goalkeeper for Primeira Liga club Porto and the Portugal national team.

Coming through Porto's youth system, Costa won the UEFA Youth League in 2019. He was promoted from the reserve side to the first-team in 2019, winning a domestic double of the Primeira Liga and the Taça de Portugal in his first season. He broke into the starting line-up in 2021, aged 22, helping Porto to a second domestic double and being named in the Primeira Liga Team of the Year.

Born in Switzerland to parents from Portugal, Costa represented Portugal at various youth levels, being part of the under-17 team that won the 2016 European Championship, the under-19 team that won the 2018 European Championship and the under-21 team that finished as runners-up at the 2021 European Championship. He made his senior international debut in 2021, representing Portugal at the 2022 FIFA World Cup.

Club career

Early career
Born in Rothrist, Canton of Aargau to Portuguese parents, Costa relocated to Santo Tirso at the age of 7. In his childhood, he played football with his cousin Vitor, with their idol being FC Porto legend Vítor Baía, whom they looked to emulate. He started playing football at a local academy AMCH Ringe, and later began going through some training sessions with Benfica, being integrated into one of their feeder club's Póvoa de Lanhoso, where he stayed for two years, standing out alongside future teammate Vitinha, before joining FC Porto's academy in 2011, following the consent of his parents.

Porto

2017–2021: Youth career and reserves
Costa made his senior debut with the reserve team on 6 August 2017, in a 1–2 home loss against Gil Vicente for the LigaPro. He finished the season with a further 31 appearances, helping to a seventh-place finish, and on 15 May he renewed his contract until June 2022. In September, he was named the club's Newcomer of the Year; late in the same year, Spaniard Iker Casillas – who started for the first team – heaped praise upon him, regarding him as his "successor".

Costa won the 2018–19 UEFA Youth League with Porto, defeating Chelsea 3–1 in the final in Nyon, Switzerland on 29 April. Days later, after Casillas suffered a heart attack, Vaná replaced him as starting goalkeeper and Costa was called up to the bench for the final three games of the season, starting with a 4–0 win at Desportivo das Aves on 4 May.

On 25 September 2019, Costa made his first-team debut in the opening group match of the Taça da Liga, keeping a clean sheet in a 1–0 home victory over Santa Clara. His first Primeira Liga appearance took place on 10 November in a 1–0 away defeat of Boavista, as the habitual starter Agustín Marchesín was suspended internally after a breach of discipline. He made a further two until the end of the campaign for the eventual champions, as well as all seven Taça de Portugal matches as they secured the double.

At the start of the 2020–21 season, Costa inherited Porto's 99 shirt, made famous by goalkeeper and club legend Vítor Baía. He remained Marchesín's backup, only appearing in one league game, and made his Champions League debut on 9 December 2020; he kept a clean sheet in a 2–0 group stage win at Olympiakos.

2021–Present: First-choice goalkeeper and domestic double
At the start of the 2021–22 season, Costa had a run as first-choice goalkeeper when Marchesín was sidelined with an injury. He was September 2021's Goalkeeper of the Month, receiving 25% of the votes while Benfica's Odysseas Vlachodimos received 22%. On 16 October, he agreed to a contract extension to 2026, increasing his buyout clause from €30 million to €60 million. After helping Porto to an unbeaten run of sixteen consecutive league games, during which he kept eight clean sheets, he was named the league's Goalkeeper of the Month for four consecutive months from December to March 2022.

He would then be part of five more victories that would seal Porto a second domestic double of the Primeira Liga and the Taça de Portugal, after keeping a clean sheet in the 1–0 victory of O Clássico against rivals Benfica. Despite finishing the season with 15 clean sheets, the second-highest total behind Antonio Adán of Sporting CP, Costa was still named in the Primeira Liga Team of the Year ahead of them.

On 12 October 2022, Costa managed to provide an assist to a goal from Galeno, then saved a penalty from Kerem Demirbay, and preserved a clean sheet in a 3–0 away win over Bayer Leverkusen in the Champions League, becoming the first goalkeeper to achieve that feat. On 26 October, Costa managed to save two consecutive penalties from Hans Vanaken and Noa Lang, becoming the first goalkeeper to save three consecutive penalties in the competition's history. His form throughout the club's Champions League group stage campaign, saw him help his side qualify to the round of sixteen, as group winners, following a 2–1 home win over Atlético Madrid on 1 November, amassing 43 saves, and a man of the Match award, during the group stages.

International career

2014–2021: Youth career 
Costa started all of Portugal's matches in the 2016 UEFA European Under-17 Championship. In the final against Spain, he saved Manu Morlanes' spot kick in a 5–4 penalty shoot-out victory after a 1–1 draw, helping his team win the tournament for the sixth time. With the under-19s, he participated in the 2017 European Championship, playing four out of five matches as they lost in the final to England. He represented the nation at the 2017 FIFA U-20 World Cup, starting in all the matches in a quarter-final exit.

In July 2018, Costa played four matches out of five at the UEFA European Under-19 Championship in Finland, helping Portugal win the tournament for the first time, but missed the final due to a muscle injury.

Previously, on 25 May, the 18-year-old won his first cap for the under-21 side, coming on as a second-half substitute in a 3–2 friendly win over Italy. In March 2021, Costa played all of Portugal's matches in the 2021 UEFA European Under-21 Championship, as Portugal finished the tournament as runners-up, losing the final 1–0 to Germany.

2021–Present: Senior career
Costa was called up to the senior team for the first time on 26 August 2021, for 2022 FIFA World Cup qualifiers against the Republic of Ireland and Azerbaijan and a friendly with Qatar. He made his debut on 9 October against the last of those opponents, in a 3–0 victory at Algarve Stadium.

Costa was chosen as the first-choice goalkeeper by the head coach Fernando Santos for the 2022 FIFA World Cup qualification play-offs, relegating usual starter Rui Patrício to the bench. On 24 March, at his club ground, he played his first competitive game in a 3–1 win over Turkey in the play-off semi-finals; he featured again five days later in a 2–0 victory over North Macedonia that sealed a place for the tournament.

Costa was called up for the final 26-man squad for the 2022 FIFA World Cup in Qatar. On 25 November, he played his first World Cup match, a 3–2 group stage win against Ghana. This made him the youngest Portuguese goalkeeper to play in a major international tournament, at age 23. He played every minute of the campaign, as they were knocked out of the tournament after losing in the quarter-finals to Morocco, where he misjudged a cross when coming for the ball, and Youssef En-Nesyri headed the only goal of the game.

Personal life
Costa and his wife Catarina Machado have a son born in November 2022, named Tomás Costa.

Career statistics

Club

International

Honours
Porto Youth
 UEFA Youth League: 2018–19

Porto
 Primeira Liga: 2019–20, 2021–22
 Taça de Portugal: 2019–20, 2021–22
Taça da Liga: 2022–23
 Supertaça Cândido de Oliveira: 2020

Portugal U17
 UEFA European Under-17 Championship: 2016

Portugal U19
 UEFA European Under-19 Championship: 2018; runner-up: 2017

Portugal U21
UEFA European Under-21 Championship runner-up: 2021

Individual
 Primeira Liga Goalkeeper of the Month: September 2021, December 2021, January 2022, February 2022, March 2022, October/November 2022, December/January 2023, February 2023
 Primeira Liga Goalkeeper of the Season: 2021–22
Primeira Liga Team of the Year: 2021–22
 UEFA European Under-17 Championship Team of the Tournament: 2016
 UEFA European Under-19 Championship Team of the Tournament: 2017
 UEFA European Under-21 Championship Team of the Tournament: 2021
Dragão de Ouro – Newcomer Athlete of the Year: 2018

Orders
  Medal of the Order of Merit

References

External links

Profile at the FC Porto website

1999 births
Living people
People from Zofingen District
Swiss people of Portuguese descent
Portuguese footballers
Association football goalkeepers
Primeira Liga players
Liga Portugal 2 players
FC Porto B players
FC Porto players
Portugal youth international footballers
Portugal under-21 international footballers
Portugal international footballers
2022 FIFA World Cup players